The Galerie des machines (officially: Palais des machines) was a pavilion built for the 1889 Exposition Universelle in Paris. Located in the Grenelle district, the huge pavilion was made of iron, steel and glass.

A similarly-named structure was erected for the 1878 Exposition Universelle, but the 1889 version was by far the largest vaulted building to have yet been built. It was reused for the 1900 Exposition Universelle as the Palace of Agriculture and Food (officially: Palais de l'Agriculture et des Aliments), and later used as a velodrome, agricultural exhibition hall and for other purposes and was  demolished in 1910 to open up the view along the Champ de Mars.

Construction

The Galerie des machines was built for the Universal Exposition of 1889 at the foot of the Champ de Mars in front of the École Militaire. Its architect was Ferdinand Dutert, assisted by the architects Blavette, Deglane and Eugène Hénard. The responsible engineer was Victor Contamin, assisted by the engineers Charton and Pierron. The structure was built by the Société des Forges de Fives-Lille and the Cail factory, and the masonry was erected by the M. Manoury company.

The framework consisted of twenty trusses. The structure incorporated the three-pin hinged arch, developed for bridge building.

It was estimated in 1889 that the building was large enough to hold fifteen thousand horses in the ground floor and the same number of riders in the upper galleries without being crowded at all (the experiment was never made).

The proportions of the structure were unfamiliar to people accustomed to heavy stone arches. The trusses were small at the base and larger higher up, and were light and narrow. The Belgian Vierendeel said, "this lack of proportion produces a bad effect; the girder is not balanced; it has no base ... it starts too low ... The eye is not reassured ... The supports of the Galerie des Machines show another fault: they are too empty."

Usage

During its twenty years of existence, the Galerie des machines was used for various purposes.

During the Exposition Universelle (1900) it held the French Exhibition of Agriculture and Food, the highlight of which was a ship with red and gold sails, a full size replica of the ship Le Triomphant, created by the Menier company. Standing beside it was the Grande Roue de Paris, a Ferris wheel, one of the main attractions of the exhibition of 1900.

The Ringling Bros. and Barnum & Bailey Circus show was held in the gallery from November 30, 1901 to Mars 16, 1902.

From 1902, Henri Desgrange asked the architect Gaston Lambert to modify the Galerie des machines in order to create a track for cycling competitions, the auto-vélodrome d'hiver. The velodrome, nicknamed "La Glacière" or the Vel d'Hiv, was inaugurated on 20 December 1903 and quickly became a popular success. In 1905 Gabriel Poulain defeated all comers.

The annual General Agricultural Competition was held there until 1908. On 20 May 1904 the newspaper Le Matin organized a military competition: the Army Walk. The Galerie des machines was transformed into a vast camp in which the competitors would rest, eat, and receive medical care. During the general strike of 1 May 1906, the troops assigned to policing the city were stationed there: six battalions of the 4th (Rennes), 47th (Saint-Malo) and 2nd (Granville) infantry regiments. There were also ten squadrons of cavalry regiments from the 6th army corps, and eight squadrons from various regiments of the 7th corps.

Destruction

In 1906 the City Council voted to demolish the building while the Senate and Minister of Architecture were in favor of its retention.
In 1909 the city announced the destruction of the Galerie des machines to open up the perspective of the Champ de Mars.
Desgrange decided to build a new cycling temple next door, at the corner of the Boulevard de Grenelle and the rue Nélaton, the new Vel d'Hiv.
The Galerie was demolished in 1910.
The disappearance of the Galerie des machines dismayed the Architecture world, since the annual exhibition was the largest annual market for agricultural producers and suppliers, where all the most important business was undertaken.

The Musée d'Orsay in Paris displays a model of the Galerie des Machines at a scale of 1/200.

Gallery

References
Citations

Sources

 

External links
Galerie des Machines, Structurae
Les Chantiers de l'Exposition universelle de 1889 at Gallica
The Palais des Machines of 1889. Historical - structural reflections Paper written by Javier Estévez Cimadevila & Isaac López César about the structure of The Galerie des Machines

Buildings and structures in the 7th arrondissement of Paris
World's fair architecture in Paris
Cast-iron architecture
Velodromes in France
Former buildings and structures in Paris
Buildings and structures demolished in 1910
Exposition Universelle (1889)